Blood from Stars is the eleventh studio album by Joe Henry, released in August 2009, and his third release on the ANTI- label.

Track listing
All songs written by Joe Henry, except where noted.

 "Prelude: Light No Lamp When the Sun Comes Down" – 5:44
 "The Man I Keep Hid" – 5:05
 "Channel" – 5:19
 "This Is My Favorite Cage" – 4:08
 "Death to the Storm" (Henry, Patrick Warren) – 4:58
 "All Blues Hail Mary" – 5:33
 "Bellwether" – 4:02
 "Progress of Love (Dark Ground)" – 4:27
 "Over Her Shoulder" – 3:26
 "Suit on a Frame" – 6:22
 "Truce" – 3:46
 "Stars" – 5:13
 "Coda: Light No Lamp When the Sun Comes Down" – 2:35

Personnel
 Produced by Joe Henry
 Recorded and mixed by Ryan Freeland at The Garfield House, South Pasadena, CA
 Engineering assistance provided by Julian Cubillos
 Additional recording by Kevin Killen at Avatar Studios, New York, NY, March 21, 2009
 Musicians:
 Joe Henry – vocals, acoustic and electric guitar
 Jay Bellerose – drums and percussion
 Keefus Ciancia – keyboards, piano and vibraphone
 Levon Henry - tenor and soprano saxophone, clarinet
 David Piltch – electric bass and editorial guidance
 Marc Ribot - electric, acoustic and gut-string guitar, bowed banjo and coronet
 Patrick Warren – upright and tack piano, field organ and keyboards
 Special guests:
 Jennifer Condos – electric bass on "Stars"
 Mark Hatch – flugelhorn on "Progress of Love"
 Marc Anthony Thompson – additional vocals
 Jason Moran - piano on "Prelude"
 Photographs by W. Eugene Smith
 Design by Anabel Sinn

Cover version 
In 2012, Tom Jones released a recording of "All Blues Hail Mary" on his studio album, Spirit in the Room.

Notes 

Joe Henry albums
2009 albums
Albums produced by Joe Henry
Anti- (record label) albums